Markes International, headquartered in the UK, develops and manufactures scientific instruments for thermal desorption.

Markes’ factory, technical centre and headquarters is near Cardiff, UK. In 2011, they expanded this and their US operation in Cincinnati, Ohio (Markes International, Inc.), adding extra laboratory and demonstration facilities. In 2017 the Cincinnati office was closed and the US operations transferred to a new office in Gold River, Sacramento, California. In 2013, Markes became a company of the Schauenburg International Group, and opened a technical centre near Frankfurt as part of their German operation (Markes International GmbH).

The company has arrangements for distribution and market development with Agilent Technologies, ThermoFisher Scientific, and a number of other distributors.

Markes International holds patents for a number of technological innovations, including diffusion-locking caps and inserts for sorbent tubes, RFID tags for sorbent tubes, and a soft electron ionisation source.

In 2015 Markes International received a Queen's Award for Enterprise in the "International Trade" category (2015).

References

See also 

Scientific instrument 
Thermal desorption

Companies of Wales
1997 establishments in Wales
Companies based in Rhondda Cynon Taf
Instrument-making corporations
Manufacturing companies established in 1997
Welsh brands